KTGE (1570 AM) is a radio station broadcasting a Regional Mexican format. It is licensed to Salinas, California, United States, and serves the Santa Cruz area.  The station is owned by Wolfhouse Radio Group.

References

External links

TGE
TGE